Asansol Municipal Corporation (AMC) is the civic body that governs Asansol in Asansol Sadar subdivision of Paschim Bardhaman district, West Bengal, India.

History
Union Committees were set up in Asansol, Raniganj, Katwa and Kalna, according to a notification issued on 29 October 1850. These Union Committees carried out the functions of municipalities. Assensole (now Asansol) Municipality was set up on 1 July 1885, according to a notification dated 23 April 1885. Initially, the municipality covered the Railway Colony, the English area, Budhdanga village, Bastin’s Bazar, Pucca Bazar, Munshi Bazar and Talpukur Chati areas. The first committee was formed with seven government officials as ex-officio members and twelve nominated members.

Over the years, Asansol grew considerably with the growth coal mining, development of railways and growth of IISCO’s steel plant at Burnpur. Asansol municipal corporation was formed in 1994, with the addition of Burnpur Notified Area Authority, some rural parts of Asansol community development block and some colliery areas.

According to the Kolkata Gazette notification of 3 June 2015, the municipal areas of Kulti, Raniganj and Jamuria were included within the jurisdiction of Asansol Municipal Corporation.

Geography
The mouzas included in Asansol Municipal Corporation, as per 2015 Gazette notification, were as follows:

Jamuria: Jhila, Shibpur, Nandi, Damodarpur, Jamuria, Kaithi, Pariharpur, Sripur, Kundlia, Joba, Khokula, Ninga, Chanda, Bogra, Banali, Mithapur, Satgram, Katagora, Bijpur, Balanpur, Mandalpur, Ikra, Sekpur, Mamudpur and Sarthakpur.
 
Raniganj: Raniganj, Searsole, Amrasota, Ronal, Kumar Bazar and Mangalpur.
 
Kulti: Debipur, Duburdi, Indkata, Damagoria, Jamaldi, Chanpatria, Digari, Sabanpur, Baria, Lalbazar, Ramnagar, Manberia, Balitora, Kendua, Petna, Kulti, Lachmanpur, Rampur, Calbalpur, Dedi, Kultora, Pupuri, Badirachak, Mahutdi, Shipur, Kuldi, Namagarapara, Gangutia, Raydi, Barakar, Chungaria, Mahatadi, Boldi, Narayanchak, Hatinal, Para, Jasaldi, Sanctoria, Dishergarh, Shitalpur, Manoharchak, Chota Demua, Sodepur, Radhanagar, Asanbani, Bhanrra, Kalikapur, Sitarampur, Belrui, Lachipur, Kumardiha, Neamatpur, Bamundiha, Alladi, Mithani, Kamalpur, Henrelgaria, Bejdi, Paidi and Chinakuri.

Amongst the collieries in Asansol Municipal Corporation are: Damra, Ajay Second, Khusadanga, Girmint, Kakor Danga, C.M. Ghushik, 3 No. Ghushik, Mohishila Hattola, Narshamuda, Dhemomain and K.D. Sim.

Demographics
The 2011 Census of India was carried out well before the reorganisation of Asansol Municipal Corporation in 2015. Census data for the area, which is part of Asansol Municipal Corporation since 2015, is given below:

Asansol urban agglomeration

 the 2011 census, the urban agglomeration (UA)) centred upon Asansol had a population of 1,243,414. In addition to the erstwhile municipalities of Kulti, Jamuria, and Raniganj subsequently incorporated into the AMC, the agglomeration included the census towns of Amkula, Baktarnagar, Ballavpur, Bhanowara, Domohani, Egara, Jemari, Majiara, Murgathaul, Raghunathchak, Sahebganj and Topsi, and also Charanpur, an outgrowth of Jamuria.

This urban agglomeration was rated the second most populous in West Bengal (after Kolkata), and the 39th most populous in India.
The expanding Asansol UA has been listed by a European research institute as the eleventh fastest growing urban area in India, and the 42nd fastest growing in the world.

Elections
All India Trinamool Congress swept the first election after expansion of Asansol Municipal Corporation, held in 2015.

Boroughs

Wards
Details of wards are as follows:

1 This is a broad indication of the neighbourhood covered, not a full description

See also
 Durgapur Municipal Corporation

References

 

Organisations based in Asansol
Municipal corporations in West Bengal
1994 establishments in West Bengal
Politics of Paschim Bardhaman district